The IBM 728 magnetic tape drive was used on the SAGE AN/FSQ-7 computer. It was physically similar to the IBM 727, but with significantly different specifications.

This is one of several IBM 7 track tape drives.

             Tape Word Bit Positions
  
             ----------------------------->   Tape travel
             LS   L6   L12  R2   R8   R14
             L1   L7   L13  R3   R9   R15
             L2   L8   L14  R4   R10  P
             SYN  SYN  SYN  SYN  SYN  SYN
             L3   L9   L15  R5   R11  EOF
             L4   L10  RS   R6   R12  EOF
             L5   L11  R1   R7   R13  EOF
             ----------------------------->   Tape travel

728
Tape 728